Metula is a town in the Northern District of Israel. Metula is located next to the northern border with Lebanon. Metula is the northernmost town in Israel.

History

Bronze and Iron Age
Metula is located near the sites of the biblical cities of Dan, Abel Bet Ma'akha, and Ijon.

Roman and Byzantine periods
A settlement existed in the area in the Roman and Byzantine periods. Ancient wine presses and a mosaic pavement have been found here. A tomb excavated in 1967 contained at least four graves dating from between the late third century and the late sixth century.

Ottoman period

In 1816, the traveller Buckingham visited "a large village, called Metully, altogether inhabited by Druses". In 1875, Victor Guérin described Methelleh or Metelleh as a village with a spring, occupied by Druzes from the Hauran who cultivated a garden to the east. Soon afterwards, in 1881, the Palestine Exploration Fund's Survey of Western Palestine recorded "El Mutallah: A small village, built of stone, containing about 100 Druzes, situated on slope of hill, near a large stream, surrounded by arable land."

Founding of the Jewish moshava
When the Druze Rebellion of 1895 broke out, the men of Mutallah joined its ranks. Since the women were not able to cope with the work, the owner of the land, a Christian from Sidon named Jabur Bey Riskalas (Greek Diplomat to Middle East), sold 12,800 dunams of land to Baron de Rothschild's chief officer Joshua Ossovetski. It had been inhabited and cultivated by more than 600 Druze tenant farmers. When the Druze Rebellion was put down, the men returned and demanded their tenancy rights back. Ossovetski called in the Turkish authorities, who came to arrest the Druse as deserters and rebels, while Ossovetski offered them paltry compensation to leave the land. Many were dissatisfied and eight years of feuds and violent clashes ensued. Eventually an agreement was reached between the villagers and the Jewish Colonization Association in 1904 for an additional payment of 60,000 francs (3,000 Turkish pounds). This episode brought much criticism of the methods of Rothschild's agents, including some from other Zionists such as Ahad Ha'am. The Druze moved to other Druze-inhabited villages, including Isfiya on Mount Carmel.

The Jewish moshava settlement was founded in June 1896 by 60 farming families from more established settlements and 20 families of non-farming professions. Most of the founders were immigrants from Russia. Pioneers (halutzim) from Petah Tikva also joined in settling Metula, as did some religious scholars from Safed.

Mandatory period

At the end of World War I, Metula was in the area of French military occupation. The British Zionist Norman Bentwich wrote in 1919:
"Metullah, the most northern outpost, is acquiring a new function as a summer resort for the rest of the country. Its mountain air and its splendid site, high up above a ravine, down which a stream dashes headlong to Jordan, makes it a chosen place in the dry days, and already its few homesteads are crowded in July and August. Metullah is a summer station for the hardy men and women of the colonies; it lies too far from the high road to attract the tourist, but in course of time it, or some other place in the highland region, will become for the Jewish dwellers of the lowlands what a number of hill stations in the Lebanon are already to the Syrians of the plains."

The 1920 boundary agreement between Britain and France stated that Metula was to be in Palestine, but it was not until 1924 that the change to British control was complete. During the intervening years, the residents of Metula even took part in elections for the Lebanese parliament.

Nahal Ayyun Bridge

The bridge over Nahal Ayyun was built by the British in the years 1943-44. On June 17, 1946 (Night of the bridges) all four Palmach battalions (the Haganah elite units) captured and destroyed 11 border bridges. As a consequence, on June 29, 1946 ("Black Sabbath"), the British soldiers imprisoned many Yishuv leaders and Palmach members. The bridge was blown up again by the Palmach during the War of Independence. The bridge was repaired in the 1980s.

State of Israel
In modern Israel, Metula is known as a wealthy town popular as a tourist destination, especially for Israeli schoolchildren during summer vacation.

The "Good Fence" (1976–2000)
The Good Fence (HaGader HaTova or Fatima Crossing) was a border crossing from Metula to Lebanon opened in 1976 and closed in 2000 after Israel's withdrawal from Lebanon. The border crossing allowed the population of southern Lebanon to find jobs in northern Israel, access health services, attend school in Israel, and transport goods.

1985 attack

The Safari Disaster happened during the South Lebanon conflict (1985–2000). In the afternoon of Sunday, March 10, 1985, a convoy of IDF soldiers on their "Safari" model trucks were driving from Metula towards the Lebanese town of Marjayoun. Dozens of soldiers, just returned from Shabbat, were on their way to duty. In accordance with regulations, one armed jeep in the forefront and two on the tail, the soldiers were wearing helmets and bullet-proof vests. They were just crossing the narrow bridge over Nahal Ayyun at 13:45, when they noticed on the other side a red Chevrolet pickup truck driving towards them. The soldiers of the first jeep noticed just one driver, smiling friendly. They signaled him to pull over to let the convoy pass. The first jeep and the first safari truck passed, when at 13:50 a tremendous explosion occurred, which shattered windows even back in Metula. The red truck exploded in a huge fireball, and hurled soldiers through the air. Twelve soldiers were killed and 14 wounded in the explosion.

2006 Lebanon War
During the 2006 Lebanon War, Metula became a ghost town as its population temporarily fled to escape Hezbollah rocket fire. The town was hit by 120 rockets during the war.

Area and population

The municipality governs a land area of 2,000 dunams (2 km²). According to the Israel Central Bureau of Statistics (CBS), in September 2003 Metula had a population of 1,400, predominantly Jewish. Metula was declared a local council in 1949. Also according to the CBS, the population over the years was:
1948 – 172
1961 – 261
1972 – 333
1983 – 589
1995 – 942
2008 – 1,500
 –

Geography and climate

Metula lies in the northernmost point of Israel, next to the Lebanese border  at 520 m above sea level.

Winters are usually cold and wet, with an average annual rainfall of 900 mm, while summers are warm and dry. The river Nahal Ayoun has its sources in Lebanon, about seven kilometers north of Metula.

Notable residents
Olga Danilov (born 1973), Israeli Olympic speed skater
Alexandra Zaretsky (born 1987), Israeli ice dancer
Roman Zaretsky (born 1983), Israeli ice dancer

Notes

Bibliography

External links

Metula municipality
Places To Visit in Metula (English)
Canada Centre
Israel Nature and National Parks Protection Authority, Eng+Heb
Survey of Western Palestine, Map 2: IAA, Wikimedia commons

Local councils in Northern District (Israel)